Ale silver was a rent or tribute annually paid to the Lord Mayor of London by those that sold ale within the city of London.

See also
History of London

References

History of the City of London